Steven Jay Williams (born July 24, 1974), better known by his online alias Boogie2988 or just Boogie, is an American YouTuber best known for his video rants about video games and nerd culture as a character named "Francis".

Early life and education
Williams grew up in St. Paul, Virginia. His father, Carl Williams (May 1, 1935 - September 2, 2001) was a coal miner, and his mother, Wanda Faye Williams (née Privett) (December 6, 1941 - June 10 or October 8, 2009) was a preschool teacher. He has two older siblings.

Williams described his childhood as a "sad" time period in his life, due to dealing with obesity, lack of friends, and suffering verbal and physical abuse from his mother. Despite this, her death in 2009 while he was in the same hospital as her has been considered the saddest moment of his life. He had already been depressed because of his father losing his battle with cancer. Williams had gastric bypass surgery due to morbid obesity on August 1, 2017.

Williams graduated from St. Paul High School in Virginia and attended University of Virginia's College at Wise, but did not graduate. He later moved to Fayetteville, Arkansas, where his life improved momentarily but soon worsened, and he did not leave his home for seven years while being supported by a friend. It was then that he discovered YouTube and started to create videos, which he said gave his life a meaning.

YouTube career
The Francis character is based on stereotypes of nerdy video game players and often parodies trending video game news, reaction, and culture.

Williams based the character on his early life experiences and has said that he wants viewers to hate the character for embodying gamer stereotypes. Boogie2988 videos range from absurd rants to serious discussions on daily life, such as the ethics of paid promotion on YouTube channels, and his experiences with mental health.

Boogie won the Trending Gamer award at The Game Awards 2016.

In June 2016, Boogie's YouTube account was temporarily closed due to an anonymous hacker. The unidentified person got hold of his phone number via Verizon during his time at VidCon and was able to gain access to his accounts associated with it, including his YouTube channel. His channel was restored less than a week later.

Controversies
In October 2018, Boogie faced scrutiny due to his relationship with the controversial counseling service BetterHelp. He and other YouTubers sponsored by the service were accused of profiting from mental illness, which led to Boogie publicly terminating his partnership with the company. Later that month, Boogie was removed from a Dungeons & Dragons charity event due to concerns from LGBT activists.

In February 2019, Boogie joked that he would "make a better team leader" over another player due to their parents' divorce and correlated it with anger issues during a live stream of the game Apex Legends. He became the subject of criticism following these comments.

In April 2019, Boogie admitted to potentially committing tax fraud. He stated that he purchases Magic: The Gathering cards for his channel, writes them off as a business expense, and then resells them without claiming the income on his taxes. The IRS states that income above $400 from self-employment must be reported.

In June 2019, Boogie faced criticism after clips from older live streams of him making racially charged comments resurfaced. He commented during one live stream, "That's a lot of money, I guess, for a person of color, or is it not?" after receiving a $3 donation from a follower who frequently donated to him on his stream with the message "I am a black person".

On June 27, 2019, Boogie announced on Twitter that he had purchased a new Tesla automobile. Following his announcement, Boogie held a live stream in early July in which he sarcastically asked for money to help pay for the new car, upsetting some of his viewers who took his comments seriously. Boogie subsequently received harsh criticism for his live stream, prompting him to clarify that he did not actually purchase the car, but rather only put a down payment on it, and that he had cancelled the order as a result of the backlash against him, among other things.

In August 2019, Boogie made a controversial statement against his internet trolls where he claimed "I think that there are rapists and Nazis out there who... are more redeemable than you because at least they're doing something they believe in."

In August 2020, Boogie announced on Twitter that he was teaming up with Palangi Studios co-founders, Matt Murphy & Joe Boyajian, for an upcoming project. After no other details were announced regarding this project, Boogie tweeted about two guys who tried to hustle him into receiving a Playstation 5 before the release date was verified by Sony. There was significant backlash from the Palangi Studios community who felt that Boogie was blatantly insinuating the co-founders had been behind the scheme. Boogie eventually deleted the tweet and apologized for the situation during a livestream, later blaming a recent panic attack for the accusations.

Personal life
Shortly after his mother's death in 2009, he met Desiree "Dez" and she moved to Arkansas to live with him. She later became known in his content as Dez2988, taking on his numerical suffix and occasionally portraying the unseen character of Francis' sister. In October 2013, Williams and Desiree got married. On December 19, 2017, Williams announced that Desiree filed for divorce and had planned to for a while, but waited until he sufficiently recovered from his gastric bypass surgery which was back in August 2017. The divorce was finalized on February 13, 2018. He is a theist.

In November 2022, Williams was diagnosed with polycythemia vera, a type of blood cancer.

Aggravated assault charge
In September 2020, Boogie began trending on Twitter after news broke out of an ongoing conflict between him and Frank Hassle, a YouTuber who began harassing him over the course of several months after suspecting he was the cause of his channels' termination. After Hassle had made his way down to Boogie's home in Arkansas, the two were interviewed by Keemstar, in which Boogie threatened to kill Hassle if he stepped on his property. The next day after Hassle showed up at his house wearing a GoPro, Boogie pulled out a gun and fired a warning shot into the air. Hassle eventually left and the entire incident was caught on camera. A police investigation was launched shortly afterwards. On May 7, 2021, a warrant was issued for Boogie's arrest on a charge of aggravated assault with a $5,000 bond by the Washington County, Arkansas sheriff's department. Boogie turned himself in on May 12, was processed over the course of three and a half hours and posted for bail. He pled guilty during his court session. On March 7, 2022, Boogie stated that his case was settled on a deferred adjudication.

Filmography

Television

Web

References

1974 births
Living people
American YouTubers
English-language YouTube channels
People from St. Paul, Virginia
Video bloggers
Twitch (service) streamers
YouTube controversies
People charged with assault
YouTube channels launched in 2008
The Game Awards winners